Between 1937 and 1945 the Japanese Imperial Army formed 126 Independent Mixed Brigades (numbered 1–136 with some gaps), typically composed of various units detached from other formations.  Some were composed of separate, independent assets (usually Independent Infantry Battalions).  These brigades were task organized under unified command and were normally used in support roles, as security, force protection, POW and internment camp guards and labor in occupied territories.  An Independent Mixed Brigade had between 5,000 and 11,000 troops.

History
The first two of these Independent Mixed Brigades formed by the Kwangtung Army in the 1930s were the IJA 1st Independent Mixed Brigade and the IJA 11th Independent Mixed Brigade. Each of these brigades was organized in a unique manner; the 1st was disbanded in 1937 while the 11th was formed into the IJA 26th Division in 1938.

Later a series of Independent Mixed Brigades were formed for the purpose of garrisoning the large territories of China captured in the early phase of the Second Sino-Japanese War. This variety for China was usually organized with five infantry battalions, an artillery unit, and labor troops. In the Pacific theater they had different and more varied configurations of subordinate units.

The Hong Kong Defence Force, which was established in 1942 to occupy Hong Kong, was equivalent to an Independent Mixed Brigade.

List of Independent Mixed Brigades

Kwangtung Army
IJA 1st Independent Mixed Brigade (posted at Chichi-jima)
IJA 11th Independent Mixed Brigade (became 26th division)

Brigades formed for the Second Sino-Japanese War and Pacific War

 (list is believed to be complete)

See also
List of Japanese Infantry divisions
List of IJA Mixed Brigades

Bibliography
 Victor Madej: Japanese Armed Forces Order of Battle, 1937–1945. Game Publishing, 1981, .
 Philip Jowett: The Japanese Army 1931–45 (1) Osprey Publishing, 2002, 
 Gordon Rottman: Japanese Army in World War II, Conquest of the Pacific Osprey Publishing, 2005, 
 Gordon Rottman: Japanese Army in World War II, The South Pacific and New Guinea, 1942–43 Osprey Publishing, 2005,

References

 
Japanese World War II brigades
Military units and formations established in 1937
Military units and formations disestablished in 1945